Walter's (formerly Walter's on Washington) is a music venue in the Northside Village neighborhood of Houston.  Originally opening in 2000 at 4215 Washington Avenue, the venue permanently moved to 1120 Naylor Street on December 25, 2011.  The club hosts both local and touring musical acts. The founding owner of the club, Pam Robinson died last fall at the age of 55 after a cancer fight. Her son Zack Palmer took over the reins in late November.

References

External links
Official website

2000 establishments in Texas
Music venues in Houston